Walker Township is a township in Henry County, in the U.S. state of Missouri.

Walker Township was established in 1873, taking its name from Calvin Edward Walker, a pioneer citizen.

References

Townships in Missouri
Townships in Henry County, Missouri